Climești may refer to several villages in Romania:

 Climești, a village in Berești-Bistrița Commune, Bacău County
 Climești, a village in Făurei Commune, Neamț County